Véronique Cortier is a French mathematician and computer scientist specializing in cryptography. Her research has applied mathematical logic in the formal verification of cryptographic protocols, and has included the development of secure electronic voting systems. She has also contributed to the public dissemination of knowledge about cryptography through a sequence of posts on the binaire blog of Le Monde. She is a director of research with CNRS, associated with the Laboratoire Lorrain de Recherche en Informatique et ses Applications (LORIA) at the University of Lorraine in Nancy.

Education and career
Cortier studied mathematics and computer science at the École normale supérieure de Cachan from 1997 until 2001, earning a master's degree and completing her agrégation. She remained at Cachan for her doctoral studies, completing a Ph.D. in 2003 with the dissertation Automatic Verification of Cryptographic Protocols supervised by Hubert Comon. She joined the French Centre national de la recherche scientifique (CNRS) in 2003, completed a habilitation in 2009, and became a director of research with CNRS in 2010.

Recognition
She also won a second dissertation prize, from Le Monde. In 2015 she became the second woman to win the INRIA and French Academy of Sciences Young Researcher Award for her work on Belenios, a secure electronic voting system. In 2022 she won the CNRS Silver Medal.

References

External links
Home page

Year of birth missing (living people)
Living people
French women computer scientists
French cryptographers
21st-century French mathematicians
21st-century women mathematicians
Women cryptographers
French women mathematicians
Research directors of the French National Centre for Scientific Research